Petr Mika (born February 12, 1979) is a Czech former professional ice hockey player who played three games in the National Hockey League with the New York Islanders during the 1999–00 season. The rest of his career, which lasted from 1996 to 2010, was mainly spent in the Czech Extraliga. Internationally Mika played for the Czech national junior team at the 1999 World Junior Championships.

Career statistics

Regular season and playoffs

International

External links 
 

1979 births
Living people
Bridgeport Sound Tigers players
Dresdner Eislöwen players
Czech ice hockey right wingers
HC Berounští Medvědi players
HC Havířov players
HC Karlovy Vary players
HC Most players
HC Oceláři Třinec players
HC Plzeň players
HC Slavia Praha players
HC Slovan Bratislava players
HC Slovan Ústečtí Lvi players
HC Vítkovice players
Lowell Lock Monsters players
Motor České Budějovice players
New York Islanders draft picks
New York Islanders players
Ottawa 67's players
Piráti Chomutov players
Springfield Falcons players
Sportovní Klub Kadaň players
Ice hockey people from Prague
VEU Feldkirch players
Czech expatriate ice hockey players in Canada
Czech expatriate ice hockey players in the United States
Czech expatriate ice hockey players in Germany
Czech expatriate ice hockey players in Slovakia
Czech expatriate sportspeople in Austria
Expatriate ice hockey players in Austria